Plagiolepidini are an ant tribe from the subfamily Formicinae.

The following genera belong to this tribe:
 Agraulomyrmex Prins, 1983
 Aphomomyrmex Emery, 1899
 Bregmatomyrma Wheeler, 1929
 Euprenolepis Emery, 1906
 Lepisiota Santschi, 1926
 Nylanderia Emery, 1906
 Paraparatrechina Donisthorpe, 1947
 Paratrechina Motschoulsky, 1863 – crazy ants
 Petalomyrmex Snelling, 1979
 Plagiolepis Mayr, 1861
 Prenolepis Mayr, 1861
 Pseudolasius Emery, 1887
 Tapinolepis Emery, 1925
 Zatania LaPolla, Kallal & Brady, 2012

References

External links

Formicinae
Ant tribes